Maxime Soulet (born 26 July 1983) is a Belgian racing driver.

Career
Soulet began his racing career in 2002, competing in two races in the French Formula Renault series. In 2004, Soulet competed in both the Mini Cooper Challenge Belgium and the Belgian Formula Renault 1.6 series, winning championship titles in both. In 2015, Soulet was signed as a Bentley factory driver in the then-Blancpain GT Series. Soulet's best overall season with the marque occurred in 2017, when he and co-drivers Vincent Abril and Andy Soucek came within seven points of winning the GT World Challenge Europe Endurance Cup. They entered the final round with an eight-point advantage, but retired during the final race while their closest competitor finished third. For 2018, Soulet signed with K-Pax Racing alongside fellow factory driver Soucek. Two years later, Soulet was part of the Bentley Team M-Sport team that won the 2020 Bathurst 12 Hour. After Bentley's factory GT3 program wound down at the end of 2020, Soulet joined Selleslagh Racing Team for the final three rounds of the 2021 GT4 European Series. Soulet returned to the wheel of a Bentley Continental GT3 in 2022, joining customer team CMR's entry into the 2022 24 Hours of Spa. Also in 2022, Soulet took part in the Porsche Carrera Cup Benelux with August Racing by NGT. He would finish ninth in the overall championship, scoring 65 points.

In 2023, Soulet joined HAAS RT, initially competing in the 2023 Dubai 24 Hour.

Racing record

Career summary

Complete Grand-Am Rolex Sports Car Series results
(key) (Races in bold indicate pole position)

Complete Bathurst 12 Hour results

Stock Car Brasil results

† Did not finish the race, but was classified as he completed over 90% of the race distance.

References

External links
Profile at Total 24 Hours of Spa

1983 births
Living people
Belgian racing drivers
Belgian Formula Renault 1.6 drivers
FIA GT Championship drivers
GT World Challenge America drivers
Stock Car Brasil drivers
Formula Renault 2.0 WEC drivers
Formula BMW USA drivers
Blancpain Endurance Series drivers
European Le Mans Series drivers
Rolex Sports Car Series drivers
International GT Open drivers
Nürburgring 24 Hours drivers
Abt Sportsline drivers
21st-century Belgian people
24H Series drivers
GT4 European Series drivers
M-Sport drivers